This page lists the albums recorded by the rock band Hummingbird, which was formed by Bobby Tench and included other former members of The Jeff Beck Group. All three albums were produced by Ian Samwell.

Hummingbird 

Hummingbird was the first of three albums recorded by the British rock band Hummingbird.
The album was produced by Ian "Sammy" Samwell.

With initial interest from  Apple Records and CBS, the band started work on this album in mid July 1973. At this stage Jeff Beck took part in minor sessions with the band, but this did not develop into a final contribution. After signing to A&M they transferred to Island studios to finish off the album during September and October 1974. In 1975, Jeff Beck released his Blow by Blow album and performed a Bernie Holland track, Diamond Dust.

 Track listing
"Music Flowing" (Isidore)
"You Can Keep the Money"
"Such a Long Ways" (Isidore)
"Horrors" (Holland)
"I Don't Know Why I Love You" (Hardaway, Hunter, Riser, Wonder)
"Maybe" (Chaman, Finesilver, Middleton, Tench)
"For the Children's Sake" (Isidore)
"Ocean Blues" (Isidore)
"Island of Dreams" (Isidore)

Credits
Bobby Tench - guitar, lead vocals
Bernie Holland - guitar
Clive Chaman - bass
Max Middleton - keyboards
Conrad Isidore - drums
Linda Lewis - backing vocals

Original release
 AMLS 68292 (1975)

Reissues
Universal 	93243 (2007)
Umvd Import 	93243 (2007)

Singles
"For the Children's Sake" /"You can keep your money" A&M AMS 7193 (1975)

We Can't Go On Meeting Like This 

We Can't Go On Meeting Like This was the second of three albums recorded by the British rock band Hummingbird. 
This was the first album with  Bernard "Pretty" Purdie as drummer and was produced by Ian "Sammy" Samwell. Max Middleton and Robert Ahwai would later go on to work with Chris Rea.

 Track listing
"Fire and Brimstone" 		
"Gypsy Skys" 		
"Trouble Maker" 		
"Scorpio" 		
"We Can't Go on Meeting Like This" (Bobby Tench, Ian Samwell, Max Middleton) 		
"The City Mouse" 		
"A Friend Forever" 		
"Heaven Knows" (Bobby Tench, Ian Samwell) 		
"Snake Shack"		
"Let It Burn" 		

Credits
Bobby Tench - guitar, vocals
Bernie Holland - guitar
Robert Ahwai - guitar
Clive Chaman - bass
Max Middleton - keyboards
Bernard "Pretty" Purdie - drums
Liza Strike - backing vocals 
Madeline Bell - backing vocals
Joanne Williams - backing vocals 

Original release
A&M AMLH 68383 UK 
A&M 4595 US (1976)

Reissues
Universal 	93244 (2007)
Umvd Import 	93244 (2007)

Singles
"Trouble maker"/"Gypsy Skies" A&M AMS 7254 (1976)

Diamond Nights 

Diamond Nights was the third and final album recorded by the British rock band Hummingbird. 
The album was produced by Ian "Sammy" Samwell.

Track listing
"Got My Led Boots On" 		
"Spirit (Tench/Chapman)		
"Cryin' for My Love" (Lindsey/Seals) 		
"She Is My Lady" 		
"You Can't Hide Love" (Scarborough)		
"Anaconda" 		
"Madatcha" (Tench/Chapman)		
"Losing You"		
"Spread Your Wings" 		
"Anna's Song"

Credits
Bobby Tench-guitar, vocals
Robert Ahwai-guitar
Clive Chaman-bass
Max Middleton-keyboards
Bernard Purdie -drums
Pancho Morales-percussion
Airto Moreira-percussion
Quitman Dennis-horn
Chuck Findley-horn
Jim Horn-woodwind
Lisa Freeman Roberts-vocals (bgd)
Paulette McWilliams-vocals (bgd)
Venetta Fields-vocals (bgd)
Stephanie Spruill-vocals (bgd)
Julia Tillman Waters-vocals (bgd)
Maxine Willard Waters-vocals (bgd)
Trey Aven-original album cover art

Original release
A&M AMLHI 644661 UK (1976)
SP 4661 USA (1976) 

Reissues
CD Universal 93245 (2007)

Singles
"Madatcha"/"Anna's song" A&M AMS 7325(1977)

Notes

References 
Hjort, Chris and Hinman, Doug. Jeff's book : A chronology of Jeff Beck's Career 1965-1980 : from the Yardbirds to Jazz-Rock. Rock 'n' Roll Research Press, (2000). 
York, William. Who's who in rock music. Atomic Press (1978). Digitized (Aug 30, 2007).

External links 

Rock music group discographies
Discographies of British artists